Atractus orcesi is a species of snake in the family Colubridae. The species can be found in Ecuador and Colombia.

References 

Atractus
Reptiles of Ecuador
Reptiles of Colombia
Reptiles described in 1955
Taxa named by Jay M. Savage